Leonid Fyodorov (25 March 1928 – 1993) was a Soviet ski jumper. He competed at the 1956 Winter Olympics and the 1960 Winter Olympics.

References

1928 births
1993 deaths
Soviet male ski jumpers
Soviet male Nordic combined skiers
Olympic ski jumpers of the Soviet Union
Olympic Nordic combined skiers of the Soviet Union
Ski jumpers at the 1960 Winter Olympics
Nordic combined skiers at the 1956 Winter Olympics
Nordic combined skiers at the 1960 Winter Olympics
Place of birth missing